In computing, the .odc file-suffix may label:

 an OpenDocument chart
 an "Office Data Connection" file for accessing external data from within Microsoft Office
 a Component Pascal file